Prince of Antioch was the title given during the Middle Ages to Norman rulers of the Principality of Antioch, a region surrounding the city of Antioch, now known as Antakya in Turkey. The Princes originally came from the County of Sicily in Southern Italy. After 1130 and until 1816 this county was known as the Kingdom of Sicily. Prince Bohemond IV of Antioch additionally came into possession of the County of Tripoli, combining these two Crusader states for the rest of their histories.

Antioch had been the chief city of the region since the time of the Roman Empire. When the Mamluk Sultanate of Egypt drove out the knights in 1268, they largely destroyed the city to deny access to the region in case the Crusaders returned.

Princes of Antioch, 1098–1268

Titular Princes of Antioch 1268–1457

Vassals of Antioch

Lords of Saône

The Lordship of Saône was centered on the castle of Saône, but included the towns of Sarmada (lost in 1134) and Balatanos. Saône was captured by Saladin from the last lord, Matthew, in 1188.

 Robert "the Leprous" (d. 1119)
 William (1119–1132)
 Matthew

Great Officers of Antioch

Like Jerusalem, Antioch had its share of great officers, including Constable, Marshal, Seneschal, Duc, Vicomte, Butler, Chamberlain, and Chancellor.

Footnotes